The 1879 Amherst football team represented Amherst College during the 1879 college football season. The team beat Williston and lost to Massachusetts.

Schedule

References 

Amherst
Amherst Mammoths football seasons
Amherst football